NGC 458 is an open cluster located in the constellation Tucana. It was discovered on September 6, 1826, by James Dunlop. It was also observed by John Herschel and DeLisle Stewart. It was described by Dreyer as "pretty faint, large, round, very gradually brighter middle." It was also noted in the second Index Catalogue that it was "probably a cluster, extremely small, close, no nebulosity seen by D.S. (DeLisle Stewart)." At an aperture of 31 arcseconds, its apparent V-band magnitude is 11.73, but at this wavelength, it has 0.12 magnitudes of interstellar extinction.

NGC 458 is quite young, at about 140 million years old. However, the dynamical mass may be inaccurate due to the small stellar sample used in the analysis. All else equal, older star clusters have higher mass-to-luminosity ratios; that is, they have lower luminosities for the same mass.

References

External links
 

0458
18260906
Tucana (constellation)
Open clusters
Small Magellanic Cloud